Alopecurus arundinaceus, the creeping meadow foxtail or creeping foxtail, is a rhizomatous perennial species in the Grass family (Poaceae).  Native to Eurasia and northern Africa, and widely introduced elsewhere, this sod forming grass is useful as a forage and for erosion control. It grows in damp or saline grasslands and banks of waterways, and on mountains up to 1,200 m. It flowers between April and July, depending on its location.

References

External links
 Montana Interagency Plant Materials Handbook

arundinaceus
Bunchgrasses of Africa
Bunchgrasses of Asia
Bunchgrasses of Europe
Flora of North Africa
Forages
Plants described in 1808